Ryan Spadola (born February 15, 1991) is an American football wide receiver who is currently a free agent. He was signed by the New York Jets as an undrafted free agent in 2013. He played college football at Lehigh.

Early years
Spadola was a member of the Super 100 Athletes in New Jersey. Spadola grew up in Howell Township, New Jersey and attended Freehold Township High School, graduating from the school in 2009. He was among the players in the Top 170 in the country and was a member of the All-Shore Team while at high school.

College career
Spadola played college football at Lehigh. He caught his first collegiate reception for 16 yards against Holy Cross.

Professional career

New York Jets 
Spadola was signed by the New York Jets on April 27, 2013 following the conclusion of the 2013 NFL Draft. In a preseason game on August 24, 2013, Spadola had three catches for 110 yards and one touchdown. He also had a seventy-yard reception which led to the Jets' game-winning field goal. Spadola was released on October 5, 2013.

Miami Dolphins 
The Jets wanted to re-sign Spadola however, he opted to sign to the Miami Dolphins' practice squad on October 8, 2013. He was promoted to the active roster on October 31, 2013. The Dolphins released Spadola on August 26, 2014.

Atlanta Falcons 
He was signed to the Atlanta Falcons' practice squad on October 9, 2014. On November 25, 2014, Spadola was waived and replaced on the practice squad by Freddie Martino.

Arizona Cardinals
On December 2, 2014, he was signed by the Arizona Cardinals to their practice squad. On August 31, 2015, he was waived by the Cardinals.

Detroit Lions
On October 20, 2015, he was signed by the Detroit Lions to their practice squad. On January 4, 2016, Spadola signed a futures contract with the Detroit Lions.

On August 8, 2017, Spadola was waived/injured by the Lions and placed on injured reserve. He was released on August 15, 2017.

References

External links 
Lehigh Mountain Hawks bio
New York Jets bio

1991 births
Living people
Freehold Township High School alumni
People from Howell Township, New Jersey
Players of American football from New Jersey
American football wide receivers
Lehigh Mountain Hawks football players
New York Jets players
Miami Dolphins players
Atlanta Falcons players
Arizona Cardinals players
Detroit Lions players